ServerNet is a switched fabric communications link primarily used in proprietary computers made by Tandem Computers, Compaq, and HP. 

Its features include good scalability, clean fault containment, error detection and failover. The ServerNet architecture specification defines a connection between nodes, either processor or high performance I/O nodes such as storage devices.

History
Tandem Computers developed the original ServerNet architecture and protocols for use in its own proprietary computer systems starting in 1992, and released the first ServerNet systems in 1995.  Early attempts to license the technology and interface chips to other companies failed, due in part to a disconnect between the culture of selling complete hardware / software / middleware computer systems and that needed for selling and supporting chips and licensing technology.  A follow-on development effort ported the Virtual Interface Architecture to ServerNet with PCI interface boards connecting personal computers.  Infiniband directly inherited many ServerNet features.  As of 2017, systems still ship based on the ServerNet architecture.

References 
 W. E. Baker, R. Horst, D. Sonnier, W. Watson, "A Flexible ServerNet-based Fault-Tolerant Architecture," in Proc. 25th Int. Symp. Fault-Tolerant Computing, Pasadena, CA, June 27–30 1995.
 R. Horst, "ServerNet Deadlock Avoidance and Fractahedral Topologies," in Proc. 10th Int'l Parallel Processing Symposium, Honolulu, Hawaii, pp. 274–280, 1995.
 D. Garcia, et al., "Servernet II", Parallel Computer Routing and Communication International Workshop, Jun. 26, 1997, pp. 119–135, XP002103164, Atlanta, GA.
 R. Horst and D. Garcia, "ServerNet SAN I/O Architecture," Proc. Hot Interconnects V, August 1997.
 D.R Avresky, V. Shurbanov, R. Horst, “The effect of router arbitration policy on scalability of ServerNet Topologies,” Microprocessors and Microsystems 21, pp. 545–561, 1998.
 D.R Avresky, V. Shurbanov, R. Horst, W. Watson, L. Young, D. Jewett. “Performance Modeling of ServerNet SAN Topologies,” The Journal of Supercomputing, V. 14, pp. 19–37, 1999.
 D.R Avresky, V. Shurbanov, R. Wilkinson, R. Horst, W. Watson, L. Young, “ Maximum delivery time and hot spots in ServerNet topologies, Computer Networks 31, pp. 1891–1910, 1999.
 A. Hossain, S. Kang, R. Horst, “ ServerNet and ATM Interconnects: Comparison for Compressed Video Transmission,” Journal of Communications and Networks, V. 1, No. 2, June 1999.

Computer networks
Supercomputing